Lazaro Samuel Nyalandu (born 18 August 1970) is a Tanzanian politician, former member of the Chama Cha Mapinduzi and former Minister of Natural Resources and Tourism. He has represented the Singida North constituency in the National Assembly since 2000. He is currently a member of Chama Cha Mapinduzi, the ruling party in Tanzania.

Early life and career
Nyalandu pursued his undergraduate studies at Wartburg College in the United States, where he graduated with a Bachelor of Arts in Business Administration in 1997. 

Nyalandu pursued secondary and primary education in Tanzania. He went to Kibaha Boys' Secondary School and to Illboru Secondary School. In all these levels he obtained Division One (First Class) in the National Examination. Nyalandu pursued his primary education at Pohama Primary School in his home village in Singida.

Prior to joining party politics, Nyalandu worked as an international affairs and development advisor for the Equal Opportunity Trust Fund, Tanzania from 1999 to 2000. This fund was established and run by Anna Mkapa, the wife of the former president of the United Republic of Tanzania. Before that, Nyalandu served as operations banker at Northwest Bank in Minneapolis, U.S., from 1998 to 1999.

Non-political leadership and governance experience
In April 2015, Nyalandu was appointed vice chair of the New International Executive Board of Directors of Africa Travel Association (ATA), a New York-based trade association promoting travel and tourism to Africa and strengthening intra-Africa partnerships.

Nyalandu has previously served in a number of organizations’ boards including chairing the Finance Committee of the Board of Trustees of Tanzania National Parks Authority (TANAPA) from 2007 to 2010.

Nyalandu was also a student leader, known for his role as the national president of Tanzania Christian Students Fellowship (TCSF), commonly known as UKWATA in Tanzania, from 1991 to 1993.

Political career
Nyalandu was first elected a member of Parliament for Singida North in November 2000. He was re-elected two times in 2005 and 2010.

In representing citizens of Singida Rural, one of economically challenged constituencies in Tanzania, Nyalandu's focus was based on systematic result-based rural development initiatives including development of water projects for clean water accessibility, building of secondary school laboratories to encourage science learning, and bringing faith leaders (Christians and Muslims) together in development work as well as in keeping the community together.

As a former member of Parliament, Nyalandu served as a member in a number of parliamentary committees including the Foreign Affairs Committee and the Public Accounts Committee for the period of five years each. Nyalandu also served as the chair of the Tanzanian-Turkish Parliamentary Friendship Group and the Tanzanian Young Parliamentary Association.

Minister

In his capacity as a minister, Nyalandu had to work with both local and international partners in the fight against elephant poaching. As the world's leading country with over 130,000 tons of ivory stockpile, Tanzania has a key role to play in the fight against global cartel of ivory trade. In this respect, Nyalandu invited the government of the United Kingdom to join his ministry in creating transparent ivory stockpiles monitoring. This move counters unaccounted disappearance of ivory stockpiles.

In May 2014, Nyalandu convened a conference that brought together international development partners including the UK, US, EU, UAE, EAC, World Bank, UNDP, GEF, ADB, EABD, and other countries to which ivory is sold such as Japan, China, and Vietnam. The conference was an implementation action following the February 2014 Illegal Wildlife Trade Conference in London hosted by the UK Government.

As Minister of Natural Resources & Tourism, Nyalandu took major initiatives through global forums to bring new hotel and infrastructure investment to Tanzania. He succeeded in winning the bid for Tanzania to host, for the first time, the annual Africa Hotel Investment Forum scheduled for 2015.

Under his watch, Nyalandu pioneered the establishment of the Tanzania Wildlife Authority, an independent government agency charged with protection and advancing wildlife conservation in protected areas outside national parks.

In the ministerial positions he has held (both in Natural Resource and Tourism Ministry and in Industry and Trade), Nyalandu set a record of making bold and unprecedented decisions with immediate actions. Such bold decisions include:
 Cancelling of license and revoking of all hunting permits to a company that was accused of gross misconduct in hunting practices in July 2014. 
 As Deputy Minister for Industry and Trade, he advocated for transparency and fairness in international labor migration by requiring all illegal immigrants to leave the country.

2015 presidential campaign
On 28 December 2014, he announced his intention to run for the presidency in the 2015 election.

Personal life
He is married to Faraja Nyalandu (née Kotta), the winner of Miss Tanzania in 2004. They have two children, Sarah and Christopher. Nyalandu is a Christian. In 2013 after the bombing attacks in Arusha, Nyalandu was the only minister who participated in the relief operations to save victims. He organized chartered flights to airlift victims to Nairobi.

References

External links
 
 On BBC HARDtalk

1970 births
Living people
Chama Cha Mapinduzi MPs
Tanzanian MPs 2000–2005
Tanzanian MPs 2005–2010
Tanzanian MPs 2010–2015
Government ministers of Tanzania
Kibaha Secondary School alumni
Ilboru Secondary School alumni
Wartburg College alumni
Waldorf University alumni
Alumni of the University of Buckingham